William Parke may refer to:
 William Parke (British Army officer), British general
 William Parke (director), American film director 
 William Thomas Parke, English oboist and composer

See also
 William Park (disambiguation)